Hull High School is a public high school located in Hull, Massachusetts, United States. It is located at 180 Main Street at the very edge of town adjacent to the Hull Gut, overlooking Boston Harbor and the Boston skyline. Hull has an approximate enrollment of 380 students in grades 9–12. The school's mascot is the Pirates and the school colors are Royal Blue, and Gold.

Curriculum
As of 2015 Spanish is the sole foreign language offered at the school.

Athletics

Hull's football field is located at the very tip of the town and is surrounded by water on 3 sides. From the football field the Boston skyline is visible at the north of the field about 5 miles across Boston Harbor. Hull is also known for having a 210-foot high wind turbine located about 30 feet behind the north end zone.

 Football State Champions - 1977, 1996, 2022
 Football State Finalists - 1992, 2021

Notable alumni
Dean Tong, author
Kenny Greer, former MLB pitcher

References

Schools in Plymouth County, Massachusetts
Public high schools in Massachusetts
Educational institutions established in 1964
1964 establishments in Massachusetts